The MAX Green Line is a light rail service in Portland, Oregon, United States, operated by TriMet as part of the MAX Light Rail system. The Green Line is the only service that shares parts of its route with the four other MAX services, sharing the Portland Transit Mall with the Orange and Yellow lines and the Banfield segment of the Eastside MAX with the Blue and Red lines. Southbound from Gateway/Northeast 99th Avenue Transit Center, it operates the Interstate 205 (I-205) segment through to Clackamas Town Center. Service runs for approximately 21 hours daily with a headway of 15 minutes during most of the day. It is the third-busiest line in the system, carrying an average of 19,160 riders per day on weekdays in September 2019.

Planning for light rail in Clackamas County began with a proposal in the mid-1980s to build two separate lines, of which one was envisioned from Portland International Airport to Clackamas Town Center using the I-205 busway. Feasibility studies conducted in the early 1990s shifted plans away from I-205 and culminated in the South/North Corridor project, which failed to secure voter-backed funding over several ballot measures. In 2001, regional planners unveiled the South Corridor Transportation Project, a two-phased revision of the South/North project that sought light rail for I-205 and the Portland Transit Mall in its first phase. With the support of local residents, the I-205/Portland Mall Light Rail Project was approved in 2003. Construction began in early 2007 and spanned over two years. The project opened in two phases starting with the Portland Transit Mall in August 2009 and I-205 the following month. Green Line service commenced on September 12, 2009.

TriMet had intended to extend MAX to Southwest Portland, Tigard, and Tualatin with the Southwest Corridor Light Rail Project. The 13-station,  extension would have begun construction in 2022 and opened in 2027 with service from the Green Line. On November 3, 2020, voters declined a tax ballot measure that would have provided local funding, putting the project on hold.

I-205 history

Early proposals

While construction of what would become the eastside segment of the Metropolitan Area Express (MAX) between downtown Portland and Gresham progressed in the mid-1980s, regional government Metro unveiled plans for the Portland metropolitan area's next light rail line to serve Clackamas County. Metro proposed two routes: one between Portland International Airport and Clackamas Town Center via the I-205 freeway, and another between downtown Portland, Milwaukie, and Oregon City via McLoughlin Boulevard. A panel of local and state officials known as the Joint Policy Advisory Committee on Transportation (JPACT) endorsed the I-205 route in 1987 with a request to start preliminary engineering for light rail along this corridor in lieu of an originally planned busway. Their preferred alignment had been the I-205 busway, a partially completed, grade-separated transit right-of-way built during I-205's construction several years prior. Regional transit agency TriMet, however, wanted an extension of MAX westward to Hillsboro in Washington County to take priority for federal funding, so the agency called on local businesses and governments in Clackamas County to subsidize the proposed $88 million I-205 route.

A dispute between Washington and Clackamas county officials followed, with Clackamas County vying for additional federal assistance, including $17 million in excess funds sourced from the partially realized I-205 busway. In an effort to settle the dispute, Metro updated its regional transportation plan (RTP) in January 1989 to reassert the westside line's priority and commission preliminary work for the I-205 and McLoughlin Boulevard proposals. The U.S. Senate Committee on Appropriations approved a financing package later in September, which provided $2 million to assess the two segments, but at the behest of U.S. Senators Mark Hatfield of Oregon and Brock Adams of Washington, who were members of the committee, a segment further north to Clark County, Washington became part of the proposals.

Alignment studies initially examined extending the proposed I-205 route further north across the Columbia River to Vancouver Mall or the Clark County Fairgrounds. As the studies analyzed various alternative routes, however, support shifted to an alignment along the busier I-5 and Willamette River corridors. A  route from Hazel Dell, Washington through downtown Portland to Clackamas Town Center called the "South/North Corridor" was finalized in 1994. Estimated to cost around $2.8 billion, Portland area voters approved a $475 million bond measure in November 1994 to cover Oregon's share. A Clark County vote to fund Washington's portion, which would have been sourced through sales and vehicle excise tax increases, was subsequently defeated on February 7, 1995. TriMet later sought funding for various scaled-back revisions of the South/North project following a general route between North Portland and Clackamas Town Center that voters went on to reject in 1996 and 1998. In 1997, an unsolicited proposal from engineering company Bechtel led to a public–private partnership that built an extension of MAX to Portland International Airport using the northern half of the I-205 busway from Gateway/Northeast 99th Avenue Transit Center; this extension opened in 2001 with service from the Red Line.

Revival and funding

In May 2001, JPACT revisited its transit plans for the I-205 and McLoughlin Boulevard corridors, announcing the $8.8 million South Corridor Transportation Study the following month. The study narrowed down five transit alternatives in January 2003; this included building both light rail lines, a combination of one light rail service and one improved bus service, bus rapid transit, and dedicated bus lanes. JPACT recommended both light rail options using a two-phased development plan; the I-205 line would be built by 2009, followed by a Portland–Milwaukie line via McLoughlin Boulevard five years later. The existing I-205 busway right-of-way and a potential for no new taxes were two factors that led to the selection of the I-205 corridor for the first phase. With the approval of local residents, affected jurisdictions had endorsed the South Corridor Transportation Project by April 2003. Plans were amended the following October to include adding light rail to the Portland Transit Mall in downtown Portland in the first phase. TriMet published the combined "I-205/Portland Mall" final environmental impact statement in November 2004 and commenced land acquisition a year later.

The federal government approved the project on February 7, 2006. The combined project was budgeted at $575.7 million (equivalent to $ in  dollars), of which approximately $355.7 million went to the I-205 segment. TriMet negotiated a local match of 40 percent of total funding, which amounted to $197.4 million (unadjusted). Federal funding covered the remaining 60 percent, or about $345 million, under the New Starts program. The head of the Federal Transit Administration (FTA) signed the full-funding agreement in Portland on July 3, 2007. In May 2009, the project received $32 million in federal stimulus funding from the American Recovery and Reinvestment Act of 2009, an amount already committed to the project by the federal government but made available so that TriMet could retire debt earlier. The City of Portland provided $15 million in bonds paid for by raising parking meter fees, as well as $17 million from a local improvement district and $6.3 million from systems and utilities charges. Around $36 million came from Clackamas County urban renewal funds collected from property taxes within the Clackamas Town Center urban renewal district. TriMet contributed $20.5 million, and the Portland Development Commission provided $20 million. Downtown businesses spent an additional $15.3 million to improve retail spaces along the transit mall.

Construction and opening

In February 2004, TriMet awarded the I-205 light rail design–build contract to South Corridor Constructors, a joint venture between Stacy and Witbeck, F.E. Ward Constructors—both of which had worked on the previous Interstate MAX project—and Granite Construction Company. Construction began in February 2007. This marked the start of a 2-year closure of sections of the I-205 Bike Path; a new mixed-use path linking Clackamas County to the South Park Blocks in downtown Portland was paved as a permanent alternative. Preliminary work began in April and involved erecting light rail bridges over Johnson Creek Boulevard and Harold Street and excavating light rail underpasses below Stark and Washington streets. Crews were at work within Clackamas County by November. The line was over 70 percent complete by November 2008, with tracks laid from Gateway Transit Center to Flavel Street. To serve the expansion, TriMet ordered 22 Siemens S70 cars, which it referred to as "Type 4". Siemens delivered the first car in 2009; it made its first test run that March and entered service on August 6. The I-205 extension's first end-to-end test run, attended by local and state dignitaries, occurred that July.

The I-205 segment opened on September 12, 2009. TriMet created a new MAX service for the extension called the "Green Line", which ran from Clackamas Town Center Transit Center to the PSU Urban Center stations upon commencement, later extending to the PSU South stations when those stations were infilled in September 2012. The I-205 segment added  of new light rail tracks to the MAX system. Opening day festivities, paid for by sponsors and donations, were held at Clackamas Town Center and PSU. As many as 40,000 people showed up to ride the trains, which was free that day. To address its $31 million budget deficit caused by the slow growth of payroll tax revenue amid the Great Recession, TriMet simultaneously eliminated four bus lines and implemented service cuts to 49 other routes.

Portland Mall reconstruction

A north–south light rail alignment through downtown Portland had been considered as early as the 1980s. In 1991, the Portland City Council commissioned a feasibility study for a potential subway line beneath the Portland Transit Mall on 5th and 6th avenues, which was then served only by buses, following recommendations made by a citizen advisory committee. During the planning stages of the South/North Line project in 1994, planners introduced a surface light rail alternative along the transit mall, which the project's steering committee later favored when they concluded that a $250 million tunnel would be too costly. Following the South/North Line's cancellation, the city reserved revitalization efforts for the transit mall amid proposals from local businesses to rebuild it to allow curbside parking in 2002.

In 2003, TriMet planners began to reconsider the addition of light rail to the Portland Transit Mall after planning for the second phase of the South Corridor Transportation Study, which aimed to extend MAX south to Milwaukie, revealed that a fourth service on the existing tracks in downtown Portland along Southwest Morrison and Yamhill streets—served already by the Blue, Red, and (soon to be completed) Yellow lines—would push that segment to maximum capacity. Additionally, Portland business leaders pushed for the construction of a new bridge that would lead to the southern end of the transit mall instead of using the Hawthorne Bridge due to fears that the latter would create a traffic bottleneck. TriMet conducted a study proposing stations on either the left, right, or middle lanes of the transit mall and ultimately selected a hybrid center-lane travel with right-side boarding option in April 2004. A transit mall revitalization plan was approved and combined with the first-phase construction of the I-205 MAX a month later. Consisting of seven stations per split on 5th and 6th Avenues, the project extended the existing transit mall from 44 to 117 block faces between Union Station and PSU. It also added a continuous travel lane for private vehicles, which had not been present in the corridor's original bus-only design.

TriMet awarded the transit mall reconstruction contract to a joint venture between Stacy and Witbeck and Kiewit Pacific. Preparation work began with the rerouting of 17 bus lines to 3rd and 4th avenues, six lines to Southwest Columbia and Jefferson streets, and one line, the 14–Hawthorne, to Southwest 2nd Avenue. Construction commenced on January 14, 2007, with the corridor's temporary closure. Owing to techniques learned from the Interstate MAX project, businesses were kept open while blocks were closed off from north to south in three- to four-block sections. The original transit mall had been built with mortar-set bricks, which proved difficult to maintain. TriMet experimented with sand-set brick paving during the reconstruction as recommended by British civil engineer John Knapton, who studied Roman road building methods. Tracks were laid  into the surface street while water pipes and sewers were buried  to  underground. Crews installed the last section of rail in May 2008. From June through August that year, workers closed the upper deck of the Steel Bridge to connect the existing Eastside MAX tracks with the new transit mall tracks.

5th and 6th avenues reopened to vehicular traffic in July 2008, two months ahead of schedule. TriMet began line testing in January 2009, initially with light rail cars hauled by a truck, then with the MAX system's new Type 4 trains. Bus service returned to the transit mall the following May 24. On August 30, the  Portland Transit Mall light rail segment opened with inaugural service from the Yellow Line, which TriMet rerouted from First Avenue and Southwest Morrison and Yamhill streets. Green Line trains began serving this segment later on September 12. Light rail service on the transit mall initially ran only between the Union Station and PSU Urban Center stations as transit-oriented development projects near the southern end of the corridor delayed the construction of the PSU South termini. The PSU South stations opened in September 2012.

Planned Southwest Corridor extension

The Southwest Corridor Light Rail Project was a planned 13-station,  MAX extension that would have connected downtown Portland to Southwest Portland, Tigard, and Tualatin. It would have originated at the PSU South stations in downtown Portland and traveled southwest via Southwest Barbur Boulevard, a part of Oregon Route 99W (OR 99W), until Barbur Transit Center. From there, MAX would have run adjacent to I-5, except in Tigard where it would have run parallel to a segment of Portland and Western Railroad tracks utilized by WES Commuter Rail. A terminus would have been situated within Bridgeport Village in Tualatin. The extension would have connected riders to the Marquam Hill campus of Oregon Health & Science University (OHSU) with an inclined elevator and to Portland Community College (PCC) Sylvania with a shuttle bus. A new Hall Boulevard station would have connected with WES via Tigard Transit Center and would have served as the site of a new operations and maintenance facility.

Metro adopted its 2035 RTP in June 2010 where it identified a segment of OR 99W between Portland and Sherwood as the region's next highest-priority "high-capacity transit" corridor. In January 2011, The FTA granted Metro $2 million to begin studying this formally named "Southwest Corridor". The funds focused on the assessment of various mode alternatives, including light rail, commuter rail, streetcar, and bus rapid transit. The Southwest Corridor Plan officially launched later on September 28, formalizing the development of a unified transportation plan between the involved communities and jurisdictions. In June 2013, the project steering committee selected light rail and bus rapid transit as the alternatives for further consideration. Citing a lack of present and future demand, the steering committee eliminated further planning using the alternatives to Sherwood. They also rerouted the proposed alignment in Tigard through the Tigard Triangle in response to local opposition to the removal of auto lanes from OR 99W.

In June 2014, the steering committee determined a refined route for further study that ran from the southern end of the Portland Transit Mall in downtown Portland to just east of Tualatin station in downtown Tualatin; this route was later shortened to terminate at Bridgeport Village. The following year, proposals to serve Marquam Hill and Hillsdale with tunnels were dropped from the plan because they would be too costly, have severe construction impacts, and attract few new transit riders. In May 2016, the steering committee voted to select light rail as the preferred mode alternative over bus rapid transit. They also removed a tunnel to PCC Sylvania from further consideration.  After passing a measure requiring voters to approve the construction of any high-capacity transit built within city limits, Tigard voters approved the light rail extension the following September.

At an estimated cost of $2.6 billion to $2.9 billion, the project was included in a regional transportation funding measure called "Get Moving 2020". In light of a budget gap of $462million, planners proposed reducing lanes on Barbur Boulevard and shortening the line's route to terminate in downtown Tigard. Both proposals were rejected in November 2019. Private negotiations, as well as Metro's approval to increase the project's requested budget by $125million in the 2020 ballot measure, reduced the budget gap to around $100million. On November 3, 2020, voters rejected the measure. Had it been approved, the extension would have begun construction in 2022 and opened by 2027. It had been expected to serve approximately 37,500 riders by 2035.

Route

Its western termini are the PSU South stations situated at the southern end of the Portland Transit Mall within the PSU campus. Tracks along the transit mall are split between 5th and 6th Avenues; trains travel northbound on 6th Avenue and southbound on 5th Avenue. From the PSU South stations, the line traverses the length of the transit mall, ending near Portland Union Station. Along the way, it crosses with Portland Streetcar tracks near the PSU Urban Center stations and with the east–west MAX tracks on Yamhill and Morrison streets near the Pioneer Courthouse/Southwest 6th and Pioneer Place/Southwest 5th stations. A wye connects the tracks near the intersection of Northwest 5th Avenue and Hoyt Street.

The line continues east onto the Northwest Glisan Street Ramp where the tracks join the Eastside MAX alignment and then cross the Willamette River via the Steel Bridge. From here, the Green Line serves the Banfield segment of the Eastside MAX between Rose Quarter Transit Center and Gateway/Northeast 99th Avenue Transit Center.

Beyond Gateway Transit Center, the Green Line proceeds south, entering the I-205 MAX extension just east of I-205. Throughout most of this stretch, the line is grade-separated as part of the I-205 busway, running either above or below roadway intersections. The exception is an at-grade crossing at Southeast Flavel Street. Much of this segment also parallels the I-205 Bike Path. Between Southeast Lincoln and Grant streets, the tracks enter a tunnel beneath the freeway, exiting on the opposite side just north of Southeast Division Street. Above Johnson Creek Boulevard, it travels on a -long overpass, the extension's longest elevated structure. South of Southeast Fuller Road station, the line dips under the Otty Road and Monterey Avenue overpasses before terminating at Clackamas Town Center Transit Center near Southeast Sunnyside Road.

The Green Line shares the northbound segment of the Portland Transit Mall with the Yellow Line, which diverges for Expo Center station in North Portland after crossing the Steel Bridge. It shares the southbound segment with the Orange Line, which continues beyond PSU South/Southwest 5th and Jackson station for Southeast Park Avenue station near Milwaukie. The Green Line also shares a portion of the Eastside MAX with Blue and Red lines between Rose Quarter Transit Center and Gateway Transit Center.

Stations

The I-205 MAX, which the Green Line serves exclusively, consists of eight stations between Southeast Main Street and Clackamas Town Center Transit Center, occupying a segment of the I-205 busway south of the I-5 and I-205 interchange. The Portland Transit Mall, which the Green Line serves along with the Orange Line and the Yellow Line, consists of seven stations per direction. Green Line trains serve 30 stations total, of which the remaining eight are between Rose Quarter Transit Center and Gateway Transit Center, shared with the Blue Line and the Red Line.

The Green Line provides connections to local and intercity bus services at various stops across the line, the Portland Streetcar at four stops in and near downtown Portland, and Amtrak via Union Station.

Service

On weekdays, the Green Line operates for approximately 21 hours per day. The first train starts westbound at 3:40 am from Gateway Transit Center. From 4:19 am, the first five eastbound trains originate at the Ruby Junction/East 197th Avenue station as the Blue Line and change to the Green Line at Gateway Transit Center. The first trains from PSU South/Southwest 6th & College station and Clackamas Town Center Transit Center to run the full length of the line depart at 5:27 am and 4:55 am, respectively. End-to-end travel takes around 50 minutes. In the evenings, certain eastbound trains turn into the Blue Line at Rose Quarter Transit Center and terminate at Ruby Junction. The last eastbound train departs PSU South station at 12:28 am and the last westbound train departs Clackamas Town Center Transit Center at 12:41 am. On weekends, the Green Line runs on a slightly reduced schedule, beginning service approximately 40 minutes later. TriMet designates the line as a "Frequent Service" route, with service running on a headway of 15 minutes during most of the day, which extends up to 30 minutes in the early morning and late evening hours.

Ridership

Before the start of construction, a PSU study estimated that the Green Line would carry 46,500 riders by 2025. For its first year in operation, TriMet projected an average of 25,250 riders on weekdays, but fewer people than expected actually utilized the line on its first day of weekday service. By the following month, however, TriMet had recorded approximately 17,000 trips per day. The average daily ridership in June 2010 was 19,500, increasing to 24,300 by April 2012. As of September 2019, the Green Line is the third-busiest MAX service with an average weekday ridership of 19,160, 1,480 fewer riders than the previous year. The drop in ridership—experienced systemwide—is attributed to crime and lower-income riders being forced out of the inner city by rising housing prices.

Explanatory notes

References

External links

 

 
2009 establishments in Oregon
Green Line
Rail lines in Oregon
Railway lines opened in 2009